The Kodak C340 is a model of digital camera produced by the Eastman Kodak Company.  It is part of the company's EasyShare consumer line of cameras, and is compatible with the Kodak camera docks and printer docks.

C340
Year of introduction missing